National Railway Equipment Company  is an American railroad equipment rebuilding, leasing, and manufacturing company, headquartered in Mt. Vernon, Illinois.  NREC sells new and rebuilt locomotives to railroad companies worldwide, with an emphasis on the North American market.

N-ViroMotive Series

NRE's flagship locomotive product is dubbed the N-ViroMotive and is targeted at providing light duty road switcher engines with increased efficiency and decreased air and noise pollution.  These locomotives are specifically targeted for yards and other urban environments where noise & exhaust from idling locomotives can become a nuisance.  They also fill a market segment for light duty locomotives now largely abandoned by the major builders, GE & Electro-Motive, which have not listed such locomotives in their catalog for nearly 20 years.

N-ViroMotives are newly built as opposed to a rebuilt with donor parts.  They use a low hood design with up to three diesel gensets that supply current to the traction motors.  The current gensets use a  Cummins diesel engine and can be easily swapped in and out for repair or overhaul work.  The gensets are computer controlled to switch on and off according to the demands of hauling the load.  Trucks are of the EMD standard Blomberg B design.

As of 2009, NREC has sold upwards of 210 N-ViroMotives to many different railroads, including the U.S. Army, with the largest order of 60 being delivered to the Union Pacific who plans to use them in the smog conscious L.A. area.

Model Information

Export

See also 
 List of low emissions locomotives

References

External links
 Official National Railway Equipment Company website

Locomotive manufacturers of the United States
Companies based in Jefferson County, Illinois
Manufacturing companies established in 1984
American companies established in 1984
1984 establishments in Illinois